Alexandru Fölker (born 28 January 1956) is a retired Romanian handball player. He competed at the 1976, 1980 and 1984 Olympics and won one silver and two bronze medals. In 1989 he immigrated to Germany, where he managed the Bundesliga team MT Melsungen.

References

External links 
 
 
 

1956 births
Living people
Romanian male handball players
People from Orșova
CSA Steaua București (handball) players
Handball players at the 1976 Summer Olympics
Handball players at the 1980 Summer Olympics
Handball players at the 1984 Summer Olympics
Olympic handball players of Romania
Olympic silver medalists for Romania
Olympic bronze medalists for Romania
Olympic medalists in handball
German people of German-Romanian descent
Medalists at the 1984 Summer Olympics
Medalists at the 1980 Summer Olympics
Medalists at the 1976 Summer Olympics
20th-century Romanian people